The Metropolitan Museum of Manila (nicknamed the Met) is one of the major museums in the city located within the Bangko Sentral ng Pilipinas (BSP) Complex along Roxas Boulevard in the Malate district of Manila, the Philippines.  It bills itself as the  country's premier museum for modern and contemporary visual arts by local and international artists. Established in 1976, the Met initially exhibited international artists to expose Filipinos to contemporary visual works in other cultures. By 1986, its focus shifted to local works and extend its reach to more common people by offering bilingual exhibition texts and developing several outreach educational programs like workshops and symposia, thereby promoting local pride and identity. The museum offers free admission on Tuesdays.  Partly subsidized by the Bangko Sentral ng Pilipinas, the administration of the museum was entrusted to the Metropolitan Museum of Manila Foundation in 1979.
The museum's three floors of galleries house a collection of art and historical artifacts loaned by the BSP such as pre-Hispanic goldwork and pottery, religious artwork as well as some artworks by Félix Resurrección Hidalgo. The rest of the museum is dedicated to Philippine contemporary works by various Filipino artists.

References

External links 
 
 
 Metropolitan Museum of Manila at Sotheby's Museum Network

Museums in Manila
Buildings and structures in Malate, Manila
Art museums and galleries in the Philippines